Rita König (born 12 March 1977) is a German fencer. She won a silver medal in the women's individual foil and a bronze in the team foil events at the 2000 Summer Olympics.

König attended the Kaufmännische Schule Tauberbischofsheim and fought for the Fencing-Club Tauberbischofsheim.

References

External links
 

1977 births
Living people
German female fencers
German foil fencers
Olympic fencers of Germany
Fencers at the 2000 Summer Olympics
Olympic silver medalists for Germany
Olympic bronze medalists for Germany
Olympic medalists in fencing
Sportspeople from Satu Mare
Romanian people of German descent
Medalists at the 2000 Summer Olympics